The Great Seal of the State of Oklahoma consists of a five-pointed star in a circle. According to a statute adopted in 1957, the flag of the governor of Oklahoma consists of a forest green field, fringed in gold, charged with the state seal surrounded by a pentagram of five white stars.

The seal itself contains six seals:
The center of the star contains the seal of the original Territory of Oklahoma. The seal contains the words , meaning 'Labor Conquers All Things'. Columbia is the central figure, representing justice and statehood. She is surrounded by an image of the American pioneer farmer on her right and the aboriginal American Indian on her left, both of whom are shaking hands beneath the scales of Justice, symbolizing equal justice between the Anglo and Native American races in Oklahoma and on the part of the federal government. Beneath the trio is the cornucopia of plenty and the olive branch of peace, and behind is the sun of progress and civilization.
The five rays of the star hold the seals of the Five Civilized Tribes – Cherokee, Chickasaw, Choctaw, Creek, and Seminole, all of whom have a major presence in the state.
The Seal of the Cherokee Nation is in the upper left-hand ray.  It consists of a large, seven-pointed star surrounded by a wreath of oak leaves.  The seven-pointed star represents the seven ancient clans of the Cherokee people.  The wreath of oak leaves refers to oak wood, the principal hardwood in the old Cherokee country in the Carolinas that was used in maintaining the perpetually burning sacred fire.  In this connection, oak was a symbol of strength and everlasting life.
The Seal of the Chickasaw Nation is in the top ray.  It consists of an Indian warrior standing in ancient regalia, carrying two arrows in his right hand, a long bow in his left, and a shield on his left shoulder.  The two arrows represent his guard over the two ancient tribal divisions, from which all Chickasaw clan and house names originated.  According to old tribal lore, the bow and the shield represent the insignia of the Chickasaw warrior by right of his descent from the “House of Warriors”.
The Seal of the Choctaw Nation is in the upper right-hand ray.  It consists of an unstrung bow with three arrows and a pipe-hatchet blended together.  The ceremonial pipe-hatchet was passed around and smoked in council when deliberating important tribal matters.  Though a peaceable people, the Choctaws were noted for great strength in defending their homes and country.  The unstrung bow represents peace yet instant preparedness for defense.  The three arrows, always ready, stood for the three great Choctaw chiefs.
The Seal of the Creek (Muscogee) Nation is in the lower left-hand ray.  It consists of a sheaf of wheat and a plow.  The plow and sheaf of wheat were chosen as modern symbols of agricultural industry, for which the Creeks were noted from earliest times.  It is a reference to the prosperity that agriculture brought to the Creek people.
The Seal of the Seminole Nation is in the lower right-hand ray.  It consists of a plumed tribesman shown paddling a canoe across the lake to a village with a trading post standing near the shore.  This scene represents some of the early customs surrounding the act of gathering, preserving and trading plants that were held sacred in connection with their ancient tribal religious rites and ceremonies.  It is symbolic of peace and plenty.

Around the large star are 45 smaller stars, representing the 45 U.S. states that existed prior to Oklahoma's statehood (the large star would be the 46th star in the seal, representing Oklahoma's admission as the 46th state).

The seal was adopted by the 1905 constitutional convention of the proposed state of Sequoyah.  Sequoyah, named for the inventor of the Cherokee syllabary, was a bid for statehood by Indian Territory, which comprised the eastern half of present-day Oklahoma.

See also

Flag of Oklahoma

References

External links
The Great Seal of the State of Oklahoma

Symbols of Oklahoma
Oklahoma
Oklahoma
Oklahoma
Oklahoma
Oklahoma
Oklahoma